Sporobolus contractus is a species of grass known by the common name spike dropseed. It is native to western North America, including the southwestern United States and northern Mexico. It grows in desert and plateau habitat, in woodlands, scrub, and dry, sandy, open areas.

Description
The stem bases are thick and sheathed by the hairless leaves. The inflorescence is dense, cylindrical, and narrow. It is a spikelike series of many small whitish or grayish spikelets.

References

External links
Jepson Manual Treatment
Grass Manual Treatment
Photo gallery

contractus
Bunchgrasses of North America
Grasses of Mexico
Grasses of the United States
Native grasses of California
Native grasses of Texas
Flora of Northwestern Mexico
Flora of the Great Basin
Flora of the California desert regions
Flora of the Sonoran Deserts
Flora of Arizona
Flora of Baja California
Flora of Nevada
Flora of New Mexico
Flora of the Southwestern United States
Natural history of the Colorado Desert
Natural history of the Mojave Desert
North American desert flora
Flora without expected TNC conservation status